Seo Yong-geun (also known as Suh Young-keun, born 13 September 1967) is a South Korean windsurfer. He competed in the men's Lechner A-390 event at the 1992 Summer Olympics.

References

External links
 
 

1967 births
Living people
South Korean windsurfers
South Korean male sailors (sport)
Olympic sailors of South Korea
Sailors at the 1992 Summer Olympics – Lechner A-390
Asian Games bronze medalists for South Korea
Asian Games medalists in sailing
Sailors at the 1990 Asian Games
Medalists at the 1990 Asian Games
Place of birth missing (living people)